The Kuara is a river in Sverdlovsk Oblast, Russia, a right tributary of the Vogulka, which in turn is a tributary of the Sylva. Main tributaries: Bolshoy Miass and Miass (right).

References 

Rivers of Sverdlovsk Oblast